The Church of St. Matthew is a former Roman Catholic parish church under the authority of the Roman Catholic Archdiocese of New York, located at 215 West 67th Street in Manhattan, New York City. The parish was canonically established in 1902 and suppressed in 1959. The site is part of the Lincoln Towers apartment complex.

References 

Christian organizations established in 1902
Closed churches in the Roman Catholic Archdiocese of New York
Closed churches in New York City
Roman Catholic churches in Manhattan
Lincoln Square, Manhattan
1902 establishments in New York City
1959 disestablishments in New York (state)